William Congreve Alcock (c 1771 – 4 September 1813)
was an Irish parliamentarian from Waterford.

Alcock was educated at Trinity College, Dublin.
He was elected at the 1798 general election as the Member of Parliament (MP) for both Waterford City and for Enniscorthy, but chose to sit for Waterford.

The Act of Union in 1800 abolished the Parliament of Ireland, and Ireland was allocated 100 seats in the House of Commons of the United Kingdom at Westminster. Waterford was one of the 31 boroughs which were selected to retain parliamentary representation, and a ballot was held to choose which of each borough's MPs should be co-opted as the initial holder of the single seat which would be allocated to them in the new parliament. Alcock was chosen by ballot as Waterford's first Westminster MP, in preference to his colleague Robert Shapland Carew.

At the general election in 1802, Alcock was returned as to Westminster for the new single-seat borough of Waterford.
He had beaten Sir John Newport by 471 votes to 470,
but an election petition was lodged. The petition was upheld, and on 1 December 1803 Alcock was unseated and Newport declared elected.

See also 
 Members of the 1st UK Parliament from Ireland

References 

1770s births
1813 deaths
Irish MPs 1798–1800
Members of the Parliament of Ireland (pre-1801) for County Waterford constituencies
UK MPs 1801–1802
UK MPs 1802–1806
Members of the Parliament of the United Kingdom for County Waterford constituencies (1801–1922)